The 2011–12 Southern Miss Golden Eagles basketball team represented the University of Southern Mississippi during the 2011–12 NCAA Division I men's basketball season. The Golden Eagles, led by eighth year head coach Larry Eustachy, played their home games at Reed Green Coliseum and are members of Conference USA. They finished the season 25–9, 11–5 in C-USA play to finish in second place behind Memphis. They lost in the semifinals of the C-USA Basketball tournament to Marshall. They received an at-large bid to the 2012 NCAA basketball tournament where they lost in the second round to Kansas State.

Roster

Schedule

|-
!colspan=9 style=|Exhibition

|-
!colspan=9 style=|Regular Season

|-
!colspan=9 style=| Conference USA Tournament

|-
!colspan=9 style=| NCAA Tournament

References

Southern Miss Golden Eagles basketball seasons
Southern Miss
Southern Miss